James Patrick Mahoney (December 7, 1927 – March 2, 1995) was the first priest of the Roman Catholic Diocese of Saskatoon to become its Bishop. A well known teacher, preacher, and pastor, Bishop Mahoney oversaw the Diocese during the turbulent years following the Second Vatican Council. Bishop James Mahoney High School in Saskatoon, opened in 1984, is named in his honour.

He was born in Saskatoon in 1927, and educated in Saskatoon at St. Paul's Elementary School, City Park Collegiate and St. Peter's College in Muenster, to train for the priesthood. He was the son of Denis and Anna Mahoney, He was the first Bishop of Saskatoon from the Diocese.

References

1927 births
1995 deaths
20th-century Roman Catholic bishops in Canada
Roman Catholic bishops of Saskatoon